The Missouri Secretary of State election, 2012 was held on November 6, 2012, alongside the presidential and gubernatorial elections. Democratic State Representative Jason Kander defeated Republican Speaker Pro Tem Shane Schoeller by 39,085 votes.

Background
Incumbent Missouri Secretary of State Robin Carnahan won the 2008 Missouri secretary of state election with 61.8% of the vote against Republican candidate Mitchell Hubbard.  She announced on September 30, 2011 that she will not run for reelection, creating an open seat in 2012.

Timeline 
March 27, 2012 - Filing deadline for Democrats, Republicans and Libertarians
August 7, 2012 - Primary (gubernatorial and other statewide office) elections
August 21, 2012 - Filing deadline for other third parties and Independents
November 6, 2012 - General election.

Republican primary

Candidates
 Scott Rupp, state senator
 Shane Schoeller, Speaker Pro Tem of the Missouri House of Representatives
 Bill Stouffer, state senator

Potential
 Jason Crowell, state senator
 John Diehl, state representative
 Mike Kehoe, state senator
 Ron Richard, state senator and former Speaker of the Missouri House of Representatives

Declined
 Brad Lager, state senator
 Ed Martin, attorney

Results

Democratic primary

Candidates
Jason Kander, state representative
MD Rabbi Alam

Potential
 Stacey Newman, state representative

Declined
 Robin Carnahan, incumbent Secretary of State
 Russ Carnahan, U.S. representative
 Ryan Dillon, former aide to former U.S. Rep. Ike Skelton
 Mike Sanders, County Executive of Jackson County

Results

General election results

See also
 2012 United States presidential election in Missouri
 2012 United States Senate election in Missouri
 2012 United States House of Representatives elections in Missouri
 2012 Missouri gubernatorial election
 2012 Missouri lieutenant gubernatorial election
 2012 Missouri Attorney General election
 2012 Missouri State Treasurer election

References

External links
Elections from the Missouri Secretary of State

Official campaign websites
Jason Kander for Secretary of State
Rabbi Alam for Secretary of State
MD Rabbi Alam for Secretary of State
Scott Rupp for Secretary of State
Shane Schoeller for Secretary of State
Bill Stouffer for Secretary of State

Jason Kander
Secretary of State
Missouri Secretary of State elections
Missouri
November 2012 events in the United States